The 2001 FIBA Europe Under-16 Championship (known at that time as 2001 European Championship for Cadets) was the 16th edition of the FIBA Europe Under-16 Championship. The city of Riga, in Latvia, hosted the tournament. Yugoslavia won the trophy for third time in a row.

Teams

Qualification

There were two qualifying rounds for this tournament. Twenty-four national teams entered the qualifying round. Fifteen teams advanced to the Challenge Round, where they joined Turkey, Macedonia and France. The remaining eighteen teams were allocated in three groups of six teams each. The three top teams of each group joined Yugoslavia (title holder), Greece (runner-up) and Latvia (host) in the final tournament.

Preliminary round
The twelve teams were allocated in two groups of six teams each.

Group A

Group B

Knockout stage

9th–12th playoffs

Championship

5th–8th playoffs

Final standings

Team roster
Stefan Majstorović, Mlađen Šljivančanin, Vukašin Aleksić, Srđan Živković, Dušan Vučićević, Vladimir Micov, Veljko Tomović, Darko Miličić, Vladimir Mašulović, Kosta Perović, Milovan Raković, and Luka Bogdanović.
Head coach: Stevan Karadžić.

References
FIBA Archive
FIBA Europe Archive
Bal kadeta (Archived 2013-07-02);Vreme, 26 July 2001

FIBA U16 European Championship
2001–02 in European basketball
2001 in Latvian sport
Sports competitions in Riga
International youth basketball competitions hosted by Latvia